Montu Ni Bittu is a 2019 Indian Gujarati-language comedy film directed by Vijaygiri Bava and produced by Twinkle Vijaygiri under the banner of Vijaygiri Filmos. The story was written by Prarthi Dholakia and Raam Mori. The film starring Maulik Nayak and Aarohi Patel is a story of childhood friends Montu and Bittu. It was released on 23 August 2019.

Plot 
Montu and Bittu were childhood friends. Montu was in love with Bittu since his childhood. When the family was in discussion about Bittu's marriage, he is still friend. This was not only problem but when people are considered him as probable groom for Bittu, he, the one, makes things complicated. This story will drive them throughout the journey of emotions.

Cast 
The cast are as follows:
 Maulik Nayak as Montu
 Aarohi Patel as Bittu
 Mehul Solanki as Abhinav
 Hemang Shah as Dadi
 Happy Bhavasar as Mohini
 Kaushambi Bhatt as Saubhagyalakshmi

Production 
The story and dialogues was written by Raam Mori. and screenplay was written by Raam Mori, prarthi dholakia and Vijaygiri Bava The film was directed by Vijaygiri Bava and produced by Twinkle Vijaygiri under the banner of Vijaygiri Filmos. "Rangdariyo" song was shot in Diu.

Marketing and release 
The trailer was released on 27 July 2019. "Jay Ma Bhadrakali" song was released first for promotion of the film. The film was released on 23 August 2019. The film was later released on streaming platform ShemarooMe in April 2020.<ref>{{Cite web|date=2020-04-14|title='મોન્ટુની બિટ્ટુ વૈશ્વિક ડિજિટલ પ્રીમિયર|url=https://www.janmabhoominewspapers.com/news/292652|url-status=live|archive-url=|archive-date=|access-date=2020-09-27|website=Janmabhoomi|language=gu}}</ref>

Soundtrack

 Reception 
Bhavin Raval of Gujarati Mid-day'' rated in 3.5 out of 5. He praised direction, music, acting, production and cinematography but criticised slow opening and performance of Solanki. Tushar Dave and Niraj Solanki have praised the film in their reviews and had a special mentioning for the Aarohi Patel's role and acting.

Accolades 
Vijaygiri Bava was awarded the Best Director Award at the 19th Transmedia Gujarati Screen and Stage Awards for the film.

References

External links 
 

2019 films
Indian drama films
Films shot in Ahmedabad
Films shot in Gujarat
Indian comedy films
2010s Gujarati-language films